Silverknowes  is a district of Edinburgh, Scotland.  Silverknowes lies to the northwest of the city.  The district contains over 2000 homes, ranging in size from bungalow to semi-detached housing, much of it built during the mid-twentieth century.

It holds the EH4 postcode.  Silverknowes is surrounded by Davidson's Mains (former village) to the south, Barnton, Lauriston to the west, and Muirhouse to the east.

Location

Silverknowes is located in the north west of Edinburgh, on the shores of the Firth of Forth. The district is bounded by Cramond to the north and west, Davidson's Mains to the southwest, Blackhall to the south, Muirhouse to the east, and the Firth of Forth to the north.

Silverknowes lies within the boundaries of the Almond local government ward (Ward 1), the Edinburgh West parliamentary constituency (UK parliament) and the Edinburgh Western parliamentary constituency (Scottish parliament). It is part of the area covered by the Davidson's Mains & Silverknowes Association and the Silverknowes Community Council.

History 

Until the 1930s, the Silverknowes area was open farmland. It was previously part of the Lauriston Estate, and was known as Randalston (spelled as Randalistoun on some maps), that name dating back to at least the 14th century.

In 1934, most of the land was acquired by McTaggart & Mickel, a Glasgow-based firm of tenement builders. In 1936, the firm started building houses to the west of the existing Silverknowes Road, creating Silverknowes Avenue, Crescent, Drive, Hill (formerly Circus), Loan and Terrace. The work was interrupted by World War II, but resumed in 1952 with the development of Silverknowes Bank, Brae, Court, Eastway, Gardens, Grove, Parkway and Place, these all being to the east of Silverknowes Road. Most of these roads form a series of concentric semi-circles on either side of Silverknowes Road. In 1960, Silverknowes Green, Midway, Southway and View were built on part of the former Drylaw Estate to the south.

The development was originally a mixture of private and council housing, but is now mainly owner-occupied, most of the council houses having been purchased by their tenants under the Right to Buy legislation of the 1980s.

In the early 1930s, Edinburgh Corporation started developing the Silverknowes Esplanade, a  walkway running from Cramond along the south shore of the Firth of Forth to Granton. The work was completed in 1947, at which point the construction of a parallel motor road, Marine Drive, was begun. The scheme originally included plans for a paddling pool, open-air swimming pool and model yacht basin, but these were never realised.

Caledonian Railway

In 1894, the Caledonian Railway opened a branch line from Craigleith to Barnton via Davidson's Mains, running through the south of Silverknowes. The line closed to passengers in 1951 and to goods traffic in 1960. The surviving trackbed is now a footpath and cycle path, forming part of the National Cycle Network Route 1.

Anti-aircraft measures

During World War II, Silverknowes was the site of a heavy anti-aircraft battery, situated on the north side of Silverknowes Golf Course. This consisted of a group of 'fire-burning' boxes, designed to appear from the air as a burning town or city, thus diverting enemy aircraft from their intended targets.

Amenities 

Lauriston Farm Buildings were used for Farming Purposes until the 1970s, when the Ross Family introduced a Market Garden followed by an Eatery. The Robertson Family then took over Lauriston Farm and turned it into a Restaurant, selling out to Whitbread in the late 1980s. In the early 1990s, Lauriston Farm Restaurant became a Whitbread Brewer's Fayre (1993) before being taken over by Mitchell and Butler, relaunching as The Lauriston Farm Restaurant, which was refurbished in 2019.

The area of Silverknowes, Davidson's Mains, Muirhouse (former home to Irvine Welsh, author of Trainspotting), Granton, Cramond & Cammo boasts the largest concentration of significant Country Houses in Scotland: Lauriston Castle, with its world-famous Blue John Glass and Furniture Collections, once Owned by John Napier, Inventor of Logarithms & former Home of John Law (economist) of Lauriston, World-Famous in the 18th & 19th Centuries, Chief Financier of France under King Louis XIV, Founder of the Bank of France and Creator of the infamous Mississippi Bubble; Barnton House (a.k.a. Cramond Regis), Former Hunting Estate of Kings of Scotland; Muirhouse (now Muirhouse Mansion, formerly known as Randalistoun), Grade A Listed Building, now a Homeless Hostel; Silverknowe House, formerly Silverknowe Hydro Convalescence Home (destroyed by fire in 1960 while being used as Silverknowes Golf Club House); Broomfield House owned by Earl Haig's Sister (which became The Commodore Hotel 1950s to early 2000s, a former Four Star Stakis Hotel, before its current life as a Two Star Hotel come Homeless Hostel, Almond House Lodge Hotel); Granton House (destroyed by fire in 1954 after becoming a Home for the Homeless); Granton Tower; Craigroyston House; Royston House; Cammo House (destroyed by fire in 1978) and Cammo Estate.

Silverknowes includes Silverknowes Beach and Promenade which stretches for 3 miles from Cramond Village in the West through Silverknowes to Gypsy Brae Recreational Park and Granton in the East. Silverknowes Beach is tidal and overlooks Cramond Island, which can be accessed across the Drum Sands for four hours twice a day and via Cramond Causeway, built in 1939 by the War Department as part of World War Two Coastal Defences.

To the west of Silverknowes is the Lauriston Castle and Estate.  Open farmland lies between the northern fringes overlooking Cramond Island. Silverknowes Beach and Promenade are in sight of Lauriston Castle and stretches 3 miles from Granton in the East to Cramond village in the west, along the banks of the Firth of Forth. The Boardwalk Beach Club café lies about half-way along the Promenade. There is a frequent 29 Lothian Bus Service to Silverknowes Promenade from Edinburgh City Centre, taking 20 minutes direct from Edinburgh Waverley Station and 1 hour from Gorebridge, to the south of Edinburgh. It is possible to reach the 18th century Cramond Village using this Silverknowes Promenade.  To the east side of Silverknowes Road lies the Silverknowes Golf Club and 18 hole golf course, operated by Edinburgh Leisure. The golf course stretches to the beach.  Along Silverknowes Parkway there are also well-used playing fields.

Education 

Most of the neighbourhood lies in the catchment area for Davidson's Mains Primary School and the Royal High School in Barnton, one of Scotland's most famous schools, the 28th oldest school in the world, dating back to 1128.

Previously, one of the primary schools serving the area was known as Silverknowes Primary. After its merger with Muirhouse Primary, the land was developed as housing, and now has the address of Silverknowes Eastway.  This newly developed area falls within the catchments of Craigroyston Primary & High schools.

Transport links 

Frequent Lothian Buses link Silverknowes to Edinburgh city centre, continuing to:

Boundary change 

In 2006, there were plans to place Silverknowes in the new "Forth" local authority voting ward.  This outraged residents, who felt it would lead to the breakup of Davidson's Mains as a community.  Over 600 objections were sent by members of the community and various local establishments, and Silverknowes became part of "Almond" ward alongside Davidson's Mains, Barnton and Cramond. The area is served by the Davidson's Mains and Silverknowes Association and four City of Edinburgh Councillors, MSP for Edinburgh West and MP for Edinburgh West.

References 

Areas of Edinburgh